Crabtree Brewing Company is a regional brewery located in Greeley, Colorado. Jeff and Stephanie Crabtree, the founders, started brewing in 2006 after they decided to turn their homebrewing hobby into a commercial endeavor.  In 2009, the brewery produced over 900 barrels of its various labels. As of 2011, it was still Greeley's only brewery.

Beers
Crabtree has certain "classic" beers available year-round:

 Jeff's West Coast IPA
 Boxcar Brown, a brown ale
 Ginger Bee, a blonde ale flavored with honey and ginger
 Serenity Amber Ale, an unfiltered amber ale
 Oatmeal Stout, a stout beer

They also brew various seasonal beers:

 The Dish - Hazy IPA series
 Dearfield Ale, an ale commemorating Dearfield, Colorado
 Others, including those flavored with seasonal fruit
 "5", a special Belgian abbey made with coriander, orange peel and fresh raisins and aged in wine barrels, to celebrate the brewery's fifth anniversary

Distribution
As of 2011, Crabtree Brewing distributed in only 3 states (Colorado, Kansas, and Nebraska).

Logo
The company logo is a play on words.  Rather than feature a crabapple tree (also referred to as a crab tree), it depicts a crab in a tree.  An animated version of the logo plays automatically on the front page of the company website, and appears as an Easter egg on all subsequent pages.

References

External links
Crabtree Brewing Co. website
Animation of Crabtree Brewing logo

Beer brewing companies based in Colorado
Companies based in Greeley, Colorado
American companies established in 2006
Food and drink companies established in 2006
2006 establishments in Colorado